This is a list of notables on coins of Canada. Members of the Monarchy of Canada are not included.

A

B

C

D

E

F

G

H

J

K

L

M

N

O

P

Q

R

S

T

U

V

W

Z

References

External links
 Royal Canadian Mint's Official Website
 Royal Canadian Mint Act
 Canadian Numismatic Association
 Numismatic Network Canada
 Canadian Coin News

Currencies of Canada
Coins of Canada
Canada
Coins
Coins of Canada